The Warning is a 2015 American horror and thriller film directed by Dirk Hagen, written by Summer Moore, and starring Moore, Jeff Allen, and Tiffany Joy Williams. The film is a found footage satire film based on true accounts of the Satanic Panic in the 1980s-1990s, that is filmed in the "Devil Worshipping Capital of the Western World"  Manitou Springs, Colorado.

Plot 
The 'Satanic Panic' occurred in the United States in the 1980s and 1990s. Parents were stricken with fear that their children would fall into the hands of Satan, and begin his worship.

In the fall of 2011, a major television network's new series, Investigating Urban Legends, began filming its first episode, set to air in the coming months. A fresh reporter, Taylor Skye (the shows Small Town Legends segment reporter), was sent out on location to Manitou Springs, Colorado. She was to interview local townspeople about the legend behind the town being labeled 'The Devil Worshipping Capital of the Western World.'

Taylor was hired because she grew up near the small town. She hired a couple of her high school friends to help her with her debut on national television. Uncovering stories that lead to the possibility that satanic worship might still be occurring in the small town, lead Taylor to want to go deeper, and risk entering the possible gateway of Satanic worship in the town.

Recording each step of their journey on multiple cameras, the threesome documented numerous possible satanic sites and sacrifices. However, on the last night of their discoveries in the wilderness, they uncovered something that was meant to be kept hidden. Every step of their chilling discovery is documented on camera, until the end. An end that has led to them being labeled as missing, the network canceling the show, and the deceitful cover up by the network that the story ever took place.

Cast 
 Summer Moore as Taylor Skye
 Jeff Allen as Brad
 Tiffany Williams as Angel
 Christina Pascucci as Herself
 Lyle DeRose as Alien Man
 Aeon Cruz as Sam
 Pleasant Wayne as Girl (Voice)
 Ashley M. Kalfas as Jamie
 Karl Brevik as Lurker
 Mary Ann Hogan as Scary Interviewee
 Sonja Cimone as Girl
 Bob Hurst as Tennessee Jack
 Stefanie Smith as Stephanie
 Jamie Demeter as Beth
 Grant Benjamin Leibowitz as Colby

Production 
The Warning was shot in Colorado in 2014.  Writer Summer Moore was inspired after growing up in the area and hearing the local legends of satanic worship taking place.  She set the film in 2011 because the film was to be marketed as really having transpired, thus they did not have the ability to cast well-known named actors.

Release 
Amazon released it on DVD in March 2015. iTunes, Google Play, Xbox, Vudu, and many other Video on Demand platforms released the movie in March 2015.

The film's Hollywood, California industry premiere was April 8, 2015 at The Downtown Independent and its public premiere was May 28, 2015 at the University of Southern California (where Moore is an alumni.

Film festivals
The Warning was selected into the Action On Film International Film Festival in 2015.

References

External links 
 

2015 films
2015 independent films
American thriller films
2015 horror films
Found footage films
2010s English-language films
2010s American films